Onslow Stevens (born Onslow Ford Stevenson; March 29, 1902 – January 5, 1977) was an American stage, television and film actor.

Early years
Born in Los Angeles, California, Stevens was the son of British-born character actor Houseley Stevenson.

Career 
Stevens became involved in performing in 1926 at the Pasadena Community Playhouse, where his entire family worked as performers, directors and teachers.  

His  Broadway debut came in Stage Door (1936). He performed in over 80 films, at first as the lead actor, but mostly in character roles later in his career.

Death
He spent the last years of his life in a nursing home in Van Nuys, Los Angeles, California, where, according to his wife, he was abused by his fellow residents and that his death was neither from natural causes nor an accident. He died of pneumonia after suffering a broken hip in 1977, at the age of 74. His interment was in an unmarked grave located at Valhalla Memorial Park Cemetery in North Hollywood, California.

Recognition
For his contribution to the motion picture industry, Stevens has a star on the Hollywood Walk of Fame at 6349 Hollywood Boulevard.

Filmography

Television

References

External links

1902 births
1977 deaths
Male actors from Los Angeles
American male film actors
American male stage actors
American male television actors
American people of British descent
Burials at Valhalla Memorial Park Cemetery
Deaths from pneumonia in California
20th-century American male actors
20th-century American singers